Broken Arrow is the 22nd studio album by Canadian / American musician Neil Young, and his tenth with Crazy Horse. The first three songs are in the form of long, structured jams. The final track is a live version of a Jimmy Reed song that was recorded on an audience microphone at a small "secret" gig in California, giving it a bootleg feel.

A bonus track, "Interstate," was included on the vinyl record release of the album and the CD single of "Big Time", and is an outtake from the 1990 Ragged Glory sessions. Although he would make Looking Forward with Crosby, Stills & Nash released in 1999, this record would be the last studio album by Neil Young for four years and the last in a string of rock albums broken only by Harvest Moon.

Track listing
All tracks by Neil Young, except where noted.

Personnel
Neil Young – vocals, guitars, piano, harmonica

Crazy Horse
Ralph Molina – drums, percussion, backing vocals
Frank "Poncho" Sampedro – electric guitar, backing vocals
Billy Talbot – bass guitar, tambourine, backing vocals

Charts

References

Neil Young albums
1996 albums
Reprise Records albums
Albums produced by Neil Young
Crazy Horse (band) albums